Dilworth may refer to:

Places
Dilworth, Lancashire, an ancient township in the Ribble Valley, Lancashire, England, which today is part of the small town of Longridge
Dilworth, Minnesota, United States
Dilworth Mountain, in Kelowna, Canada
Dilworth (neighborhood), in Charlotte, North Carolina, United States
Dilworth, Oklahoma, United States

People
 Isabel Craven Dilworth, American actress known professionally as Nina Romano
 James Dilworth (1815–1894), New Zealand farmer, investor, speculator and philanthropist
 John R. Dilworth, animator
 J. Richardson Dilworth, businessman and professor
 Richardson Dilworth, mayor of Philadelphia, Pennsylvania
 Robert P. Dilworth, mathematician
 Thomas Dilworth, English cleric

Other uses
 Dilworth's theorem in mathematics
 Dilworth School in Auckland, New Zealand